Vineet Panwar (born 28 June 1998) is an Indian cricketer. He made his first-class debut for Uttar Pradesh in the 2017–18 Ranji Trophy on 24 October 2017.

References

External links
 

1998 births
Living people
Indian cricketers
Place of birth missing (living people)
Uttar Pradesh cricketers